Salagena is a genus of moths in the family Cossidae described by Francis Walker in 1865.

Species
 Salagena albicilia Hampson, 1920
 Salagena albonotata Butler, 1898
 Salagena albovenosa Mey, 2011
 Salagena arcys D. S. Fletcher, 1968
 Salagena atridiscata Hampson, 1910
 Salagena bennybytebieri Lehmann, 2008
 Salagena charlottae Lehmann, 2008
 Salagena cuprea Gaede, 1929
 Salagena denigrata Gaede, 1929
 Salagena discata Gaede, 1929
 Salagena eustrigata Hampson, 1916
 Salagena fetlaworkae Rougeot, 1977
 Salagena fuscata Gaede, 1929
 Salagena guichardi Wiltshire, 1980
 Salagena inversa Gaede, 1929
 Salagena irrorata Le Cerf, 1914
 Salagena meyi Lehmann, 2007
 Salagena mirabilis Le Cerf, 1919
 Salagena narses Fawcett, 1916
 Salagena ngazidya Viette, 1981
 Salagena nigropuncta Le Cerf, 1919
 Salagena obsolescens Hampson, 1910
 Salagena quentinlukei Lehmann, 2008
 Salagena reticulata Janse, 1925
 Salagena tessellata Distant, 1897
 Salagena transversa Walker, 1865
 Salagena violetta Gaede, 1929

References

Metarbelinae